Charles Garnett may refer to:

Charles Garnett (cricketer) (1840–1919), English cricketer
Charles Garnett, High Sheriff of Wiltshire
Charles Garnett, character in Z Nation